Baker Overstreet (born 1981) is an artist based in Brooklyn.

Overstreet was born in Augusta, Georgia.  His paintings describe patterns, symbols, figures and fictional spaces.  His work makes reference to folk and primitive art.

He received his Master of Fine Arts from Yale University in 2006.

Selected exhibitions
2006
Escape From New York, Curators Without Borders, Berlin
Volta Art Fair, Basel, Switzerland
Smoke and Mirrors, China Art Objects, Los Angeles
Mary Pauline Gallery, Augusta
2007
Gimme a little Sign, Sister, Los Angeles, California
Fredericks & Freiser, The Armory Show, New York
2008
Unnamable Things, Artspace, New Haven, Connecticut
2009
Franklin Art Works, Minneapolis

References

External links
Baker Overstreet at Mary Pauline Gallery
Further information from the Saatchi Gallery
More information from the Volta Show

1981 births
Living people
American artists
Yale University alumni